Ichneutica rubescens is a moth of the family Noctuidae. It is endemic to New Zealand. This species can be found locally in the North Island but is widespread throughout the South Island and is present on both Stewart Island and the Auckland Islands. I. rubescens has a round or oval mark near the centre of the forewing that encloses a dot. This is diagnostic of this species. I. rubescens inhabits tussock grasslands, beech as well as podocarp forests. Larval hosts are likely herbaceous plants such as grasses and herbs and larvae have been reared on Gunnera prorepens. Adults of this species are on the wing from December to April and are attracted to light.

Taxonomy 
This species was first described in 1879 by Arthur Gardiner Butler from a specimen obtained in Otago by Frederick Wollaston Hutton. Butler named the species Xylophasia rubescens. The holotype male specimen is held at the Natural History Museum, London. In 1988 J. S. Dugdale, in his catalogue on New Zealand Lepidopera, placed this species within the Graphania genus. In 2019 Robert Hoare undertook a major review of New Zealand Noctuidae species. During this review the genus Ichneutica was greatly expanded and the genus Graphania was subsumed into it as a synonym. As a result of this review, this species is now known as Ichneutica rubescens.

Description 

Brian Patrick has described the larvae of this species as moss green with black markings. 

Butler described the adults of this species as follows: 
The wingspan of the adult male is between 38 and 45 mm and the wingspan of the female is between 38 and 44 mm. This species has a round or oval mark near the centre of the forewing that encloses a dot. This is diagnostic of this species.

Distribution 
It is endemic to New Zealand. This species can be found in locations in the North Island, through out the South Island and in Stewart and the Auckland Islands.

Habitat 
This species occurs in native and tussock grasslands along with beech and podocarp forests.

Behaviour 
Adults of this species are on the wing from December to April. This species is attracted to light.

Life history and host species 
The life history of this species has yet to be written up in detail. Larval hosts are likely herbaceous plants such as grasses and larvae have been reared on Gunnera prorepens, a native ground cover species.

References

Moths described in 1879
Hadeninae
Moths of New Zealand
Endemic fauna of New Zealand
Taxa named by Arthur Gardiner Butler
Endemic moths of New Zealand